Summer with Monika is a 1953 Swedish romance film written and directed by Ingmar Bergman, and starring Harriet Andersson and Lars Ekborg. It is based on Per Anders Fogelström's 1951 novel of the same title. It was controversial abroad at the time of its first release for its frank depiction of nudity and, along with the film One Summer of Happiness from the year before, directed by Arne Mattsson, it helped to create the reputation of Sweden as a sexually liberated country.

The film made a star of its lead actress, Andersson. Bergman had been intimately involved with Andersson at the time and conceived the film as a vehicle for her. The two of them would continue to work together, even after their romantic relationship had ended, in films like Sawdust and Tinsel, Smiles of a Summer Night, Through a Glass Darkly, and Cries and Whispers.

Plot
In Stockholm, the young working-class Harry meets Monika, an adventurous young woman, in a cafe near to his workplace. Monika invites Harry to join her to see a movie at the local cinema after his work shift. The two spend the rest of the evening together, and find themselves enamored of one another. At her home, Monika tires of her alcoholic father's incessant drinking and violent outbursts, packs her belongings and runs away. She seeks help from Harry, who goes to spend the night with her in his father's docked boat. After getting into an argument with his boss the following morning, Harry quits his job.

The two decide to leave the city, and take the boat into the Stockholm Archipelago, where they spend an idyllic summer together. When the end of the summer forces them to return home, it is clear that Monika is pregnant. Harry happily accepts responsibility and settles down with Monika and their child; he gets a real job and goes to night school to provide for his family. Monika, however, is unsatisfied with her role as homemaker. She yearns for excitement and adventure, a desire which finally leads her astray. Harry leaves town for work and comes home a day early to find his wife with another man.  After deciding to separate and in his rage at her flippancy, Harry hits her and leaves the apartment. They get a divorce and Monika flees the responsibility of child rearing leaving Harry with custody of their daughter, June, to raise alone. In the final shot while he looks in a mirror, he fantasizes about the time they spent together.

Cast

US Release

In 1955, two years after the film was released in Sweden, a high-profile article "Sin & Sweden" was written in Time magazine, about living conditions in a secularized Swedish society. The debate in the US that followed, in the midst of the Cold War, was marked by conservative hostility to anything resembling socialism. This and above all commercial interests contributed to the exploitation market's interest in the concept of Swedish sin.
Also in 1955, exploitation film presenter Kroger Babb purchased the US rights to the film. To increase excitement for the film, he edited it down to 62 minutes and emphasized the film's nudity. Renaming the film Monika, the Story of a Bad Girl, he provided a good deal of suggestive promotional material, including postcards featuring the nude Andersson.

The exploitation version of Bergman’s film successfully played rural drive-in theatres for years, unaffected by the fact that a year later it was re-contracted, this time with Janus Films, to let the uncut, subtitled version play at art-theaters as well. The film was thus available to two different types of American audiences simultaneously.

Reception
Summer with Monika has a 100% approval rating on Rotten Tomatoes.

Influence
Summer with Monika was the first Bergman film seen by Woody Allen:
"The first Bergman I ever saw was that one because there was talk in the neighborhood that there was a nude scene. This was unheard of in any American film, that level of advancement. It’s so funny to think of it that way. I saw it, and it was a very, very interesting film apart from the utterly benign nude moment. A short time after that, I just happened to see Sawdust and Tinsel. I had no idea it was done by Bergman – that is, the person who’d done Summer with Monika — and it was just a fabulous movie. I was riveted in my seat by it all. I thought to myself, 'Who is this guy?'”

See also
 Nudity in film
 The exploitation film Blonde in Bondage (1957) is directly inspired by the Time magazine article.

References

External links

 
 
 
 
 Summer with Monika: Summer Dreaming an essay by Laura Hubner at the Criterion Collection

1953 films
1953 romantic drama films
Swedish romantic drama films
1950s Swedish-language films
Swedish black-and-white films
Films set in Stockholm
Films set on uninhabited islands
Films set in the Baltic Sea
Films directed by Ingmar Bergman
Sexual revolution
Films scored by Erik Nordgren
1955 drama films
1955 films
1950s Swedish films